Nostalgie Wallonie is a private Belgian radio station broadcasting in Wallonia and Brussels, and is dedicated to mainly French and American music of the 1960s, 1970s, 1980s and 1990s. Nostalgie Wallonia was created in Namur by the group Les Éditions de l'Avenir. It is owned by the NRJ Group and Corelio (previously Médiabel SA).

History

In September 1983, Nostalgie starts broadcasting in France.

In 1987, the first broadcast of Nostalgie was in Brussels, then known as Radio Microclimat.
But the official date of the appearance of Nostalgie in Wallonia was on 9 May 1989, when the French company Pro Public, bought the old SiS frequencies , whose bankruptcy was declared in 1988. The French manager of the company, who already broadcast Nostalgie in Lille, decided to implement the station in Belgium.

A year later in 1989, Pro Public disbanded, and the four frequencies of Nostalgie are bought by the NRJ Group.

On the night from 4 on 5 February 1993, Nostalgie starts broadcasting in Brussels on the frequency of the defunct station Top FM on 100.0 MHz, and is today still broadcasting there on this frequency.

In 2008, Nostalgie started broadcasting in Flanders as Nostalgie Vlaanderen.

Frequencies
Nostalgie Wallonie broadcasts on FM throughout Wallonia including Brussels, but can also be heard in parts of Flanders on the following frequencies:

Brussels
 Brussels: 100.0

Hainaut
 Anderlues: 107.0
 Ath: 107.1
 Binche: 106.7
 Braine-le-Comte: 107.5
 Charleroi: 100.0
 La Louvière: 89.2
 Mons: 107.5
 Mouscron: 100.7
 Tournai: 107.2

Liège
 Bassenge: 105.9
 Huy: 104.1
 Liège: 89.7 / 95.0
 Verviers: 92.3
 Waremme: 107.1

Luxembourg
 Arlon: 102.4
 Bastogne: 106.4
 Marche-en-Famenne: 107.9
 Neufchâteau: 107.0
 Saint-Hubert: 100.2
 Virton: 107.9

Namur
 Beauraing: 107.1
 Ciney: 106.9
 Couvin: 100.5
 Dinant: 100.7
 Gembloux: 107.4
 Namur: 100.4
 Sambreville: 87.8

Walloon Brabant
 Jodoigne: 95.1
 Nivelles: 87.9
 Perwez: 107.6
 Wavre: 105.1

See also
 Nostalgie, the French radio station.
 Nostalgie Vlaanderen, the Flemish radio station.
 NRJ Group, about the Group which owns NRJ and Nostalgie.

References

1988 establishments in Belgium
French-language radio stations in Belgium
Radio stations established in 1988